Maloo may refer to:

 HSV Maloo, a car
 Kurt Maloo, Swiss musician